MFC 08 Lindenhof is a German association football club from the district of Lindenhof in the city of Mannheim, Baden-Württemberg.

History
The club was established 21 March 1908 as Mannheimer Fußball-Club Lindenhof and was joined in 1915 by Sportverein Lindenhof and Spielvereinigung Lindenhof. The club is notable for its single season turn in the Gauliga Baden, one of the country's 15 regional top-flight divisions established in the re-organization of German football in 1933. After capturing the title in the Bezirksklasse Unterbaden-West in 1934, MFC beat FV Weinheim (3:1, 0:1) in a qualification playoff and then went on to a second place finish in the Gauliga promotion round in order to advance. Their Gauliga campaign ended in a 10th place finish and relegation.

MFC was part of the 2. Amateurliga following World War II with their highest rise coming in 1999 when they won their way into the Landesliga Rhein-Neckar (VI) where they played until 2002. The club is still active today and with nearly 600 members is Lindenhof's largest sports club with departments for football and tennis. The footballers are currently part of the Kreisliga Mannheim (VIII).

References

Das deutsche Fußball-Archiv historical German domestic league tables 
fussballdaten.de

External links
Official team site

Football clubs in Germany
Football clubs in Baden-Württemberg
Association football clubs established in 1908
1908 establishments in Germany